The Mysore Commission, also known as commissioners' rule or simply the Commission Rule, was a period and form of government in the history of the Kingdom of Mysore and the neighbouring province of Coorg from 1831 to 1881 when British commissioners administered the kingdom due to the deposition of Maharaja Krishnaraja Wodeyar III and later due to minority of Yuvaraja Chamaraja Wadiyar X. A board of commissioners constituted the chief executive body and provincial head of the kingdom's government. The commission began with uninstallation of Krishnaraja Wodeyar III as King in 1831 and ended with investing Chamaraja Wadiyar X as King in 1881.

Coorg province, ruled as a "non-regulation" province under Mysore Commission, however, would never again return to its Coorg rajas and would remain part of Madras Presidency until India's independence from the British crown, after which it was absorbed into Mysore State and became a district. After Mysore Commission was dissolved, a new Chief Commissioner of Coorg was appointed.

History 
After the execution of Tipu, the Sultan of Mysore, at the end of the Fourth Anglo-Mysore War in 1799, the Mysore throne was restored to the Wadiyar dynasty under a regency. The hereditary Wadiyar prince Krishnaraja Wodeyar III was an infant and could not be installed on the throne. In his stead, his adoptive grandmother Maharani Lakshmi Devi reigned over the kingdom as Queen Regent, with Tipu's prime minister Purnaiah as her own royal adviser and diwan. The regency, referred to as Lakshmi Vilas Sannidhana, lasted until 1810 when she died. In two years' time, Purnaiah died, too, in 1812, at about the time the young prince attained the age of majority. He was inducted as the maharaja of Mysore by Duke Arthur Wellesley who had defeated Tipu in 1799.

According to British accounts, in around 1830, groups of peasants and locals in the village of Nagar (in present-day Shimoga district) in the north of the kingdom are said to have protested against the despotic land revenues imposed during the reign of Krishnaraja Wodeyar III, resulting in the Nagar revolt, leading to some hundreds of deaths. Taking note of this, William Bentinck, then Governor-General of India, asked for a committee to be formed to investigate the incident.

A committee was then formed, consisting of General Sir Thomas Hawker, J M Macleod, General Sir William Morison, and Lt. General Sir Mark Cubbon, the latter two of whom would later on be appointed as commissioners. The committee, after a year-long investigation and based on oral testimonies and sources some of which might have been unreliable, criticised the maharaja's style of rule and personal character and made no remarks particularly on the taxation. After the report was submitted, Bentinck decreed that a commission shall administer the state. Eventually, a commission was formed and came to effect on 19 October 1831. Later, it came to knowledge that reports of misgovernance were grossly exaggerated. This entire affair came to be seen as British usurpation of the kingdom under Bentinck.

Commissioners' rule 
The commissioners' rule began with General John Briggs and his deputy, Lushington, from Madras Presidency. Briggs' appointment was not seen favourably by Madras Presidency. Owing to heated squabbles between the two, they were replaced by Sir William Morison, a Scottish general from Madras Artillery. In 1834, Morison resigned to become a member of the Supreme Council of India. Sir Mark Cubbon succeeded him. Cubbon became the longest-serving commissioner of Mysore, for nearly three decades, whose commission is well know to this day. Cubbon Park and the Cubbon Park Metro Station in Bangalore are named after him. Cubbon was succeeded by Lewin Bowring.

During both Cubbon and Bowring's commissions, Maharaja Krishnaraja Wodeyar III appealed for a return of power—an idea to which both commissioners were opposed during their respective administrations, and the deposed king died a dejected man.

Bowring was succeeded by General Sir Richard Meade, a British Indian Army officer. During his commission, Meade himself mentored the new young prince of Mysore, Yuvaraja Chamaraja Wadiyar X, for his future role as Maharaja, and the two would develop a lasting professional relationship.

List of commissioners

Dissolution 
In 1881, Chamaraja Wadiyar X attained the age of majority, making him eligible to take over as the ruler of the kingdom. Consequently, Marquess George Robinson, the governor-general of India at the time, enforced the now famous Rendition of Mysore Act of 1881, inducting the prince as King. With this, the Mysore Commission was dissolved and the kingdom would return to the Wadiyars—for one last time, until it would be merged into the Republic of India in 1950.

With this, the Mysore Commission was dissolved, a Mysore Resident represented British India at Mysore Palace, and a separate Chief Commissionership was formed for Coorg.

References 

Kingdom of Mysore
Political history of Karnataka